LaCrosse (also La Crosse, Lacrosse, Wild Haws) is an unincorporated community in Izard County, Arkansas, United States.

Notes

Unincorporated communities in Izard County, Arkansas
Unincorporated communities in Arkansas